Alexander G. Fraser (8 June 1937 – 13 June 2022), also known as A. G. Fraser and Sandy Fraser, was a noted British-American computer scientist.

Fraser received his B.Sc. degree in Aeronautical Engineering from Bristol University in 1958, and his Ph.D. in Computing Science from Cambridge University in 1969. Between degrees he worked at Ferranti, where he was responsible for compiler development, and designed and implemented an operating system.

From 1966 to 1969 he was Assistant Director of Research at Cambridge, where in 1967 he designed and implemented the Titan computer's file system, and worked on file archival, privacy, and persistent names. He moved to AT&T Bell Laboratories in 1969 where he invented cell-based networks that anticipated Asynchronous Transfer Mode (ATM) and co-developed a reduced instruction set computer prototype with techniques for instruction set optimization. He subsequently became director of its Computing Science Research Center (1982), Executive Director (1987), and Associate Vice President for Information Science Research (1994). As Vice President for Research, he founded AT&T Laboratories in 1996, and in 1998 was named AT&T Chief Scientist. After his retirement in 2002 he established Fraser Research.

Fraser was a member of the National Academy of Engineering, and a Fellow of the British Computer Society and IEEE. He has received the 1989 Koji Kobayashi Computers and Communications Award "for contributions to computer communications and the invention of virtual-circuit switching", the 1992 SIGCOMM Award for "pioneering concepts, such as virtual circuit switching, space-division packet switching, and window flow control", and the 2001 IEEE Richard W. Hamming Medal "for pioneering contributions to the architecture of communication networks through the development of virtual circuit switching technology".

References 

1937 births
2022 deaths
American computer scientists
British computer scientists
Computer systems researchers
Members of the United States National Academy of Engineering
Scientists at Bell Labs
Fellows of the British Computer Society
People from Surrey